"Baker Street" is a song written and performed by Scottish singer-songwriter Gerry Rafferty. Released as a single in 1978, it reached No. 1 in Cash Box and No. 2 on the Billboard Hot 100, where it held its Billboard position for six weeks, blocked from the top spot by Andy Gibb's "Shadow Dancing". It spent four weeks at No. 1 in Canada, No. 1 in Australia and South Africa, hit No. 3 in the United Kingdom, and the top 10 in the Netherlands. Rafferty received the 1978 Ivor Novello Award for Best Song Musically and Lyrically. The arrangement is known for its saxophone riff.

In October 2010, the song was recognised by BMI for surpassing five million performances worldwide. The British Phonographic Industry (BPI) awarded the song a platinum certification in July 2022.

Origins
Named after Baker Street in London, the song was included on Rafferty's second solo album, City to City (1978), which was his first release after the resolution of legal problems surrounding the break-up of his old band, Stealers Wheel, in 1975. In the intervening three years, Rafferty had been unable to release any material because of disputes about the band's remaining contractual recording obligations.

Rafferty wrote the song during a period when he was trying to extricate himself from his Stealers Wheel contracts; he was regularly travelling between his family home in Paisley and London, where he often stayed at a friend's flat in Baker Street. As Rafferty put it, "everybody was suing each other, so I spent a lot of time on the overnight train from Glasgow to London for meetings with lawyers. I knew a guy who lived in a little flat off Baker Street. We'd sit and chat or play guitar there through the night."

The resolution of Rafferty's legal and financial frustrations accounted for the exhilaration of the song's last verse: "When you wake up it's a new morning/The sun is shining, it's a new morning/You're going, you're going home." Rafferty's daughter Martha has said that the book that inspired the song more than any other was Colin Wilson's The Outsider (1956). Rafferty was reading the book, which explores ideas of alienation and of creativity, born out of a longing to be connected, at this time of travelling between the two cities.

Studio
"Baker Street" was recorded in 1978 at Mike and Richard Vernon's Chipping Norton Studios, Oxfordshire, during the sessions for City to City. The album City to City (1978), including "Baker Street", was co-produced by Rafferty and Hugh Murphy.

Saxophone riff
In addition to a searing guitar solo, played by Hugh Burns, the song featured a prominent eight-bar saxophone riff played as a break between verses, by Raphael Ravenscroft. Rafferty claimed that he wrote the hook with the original intention that it be sung. Ravenscroft remembered things differently, saying that he was presented with a song that contained "several gaps". "In fact, most of what I played was an old blues riff," stated Ravenscroft. "If you're asking me: 'Did Gerry hand me a piece of music to play?' then no, he didn't." 

However, the 2011 reissue of City to City included the demo of 'Baker Street' with the saxophone part played on electric guitar by Rafferty. A very similar sax line was originally played by saxophonist Steve Marcus for a song called "Half a Heart", credited to vibraphonist Gary Burton, that appeared on Marcus' 1968 album Tomorrow Never Knows.

Ravenscroft, a session musician, was in the studio to record a brief soprano saxophone part, and suggested that he use instead the alto saxophone he had in his car. The distinctive wailing, bluesy sound of the sax riff on 'Baker Street' was a result of the tuning of the alto being slightly flat, and Ravenscroft later considered this to have been a mistake. He said, in an interview in 2011, that listening to 'Baker Street' irritated him because he was out of tune.

The saxophone part led to what became known as "the 'Baker Street' phenomenon", a resurgence in the sales of saxophones and their use in mainstream pop music and television advertising.

Urban myths
According to one story, Ravenscroft received no payment for a song that earned Rafferty an income of £80,000 per annum; a cheque for £27 given to Ravenscroft bounced and was framed and hung on his solicitor's wall. However, the bouncing cheque story was denied by Ravenscroft during an interview on BBC Radio 2's Simon Mayo Drivetime show on 9 February 2012.

The saxophone riff was also the subject of another urban legend in the UK, created in the 1980s by British writer and broadcaster Stuart Maconie. As one of the spoof facts invented for the regular "Would You Believe It?" section in the NME, Maconie falsely claimed that British radio and television presenter Bob Holness had played the saxophone part on the recording. Later, the claim was widely repeated.

Personnel

 Gerry Rafferty – lead vocals, rhythm guitar
 Raphael Ravenscroft – alto and soprano saxophones
 Hugh Burns – lead guitar
 Nigel Jenkins – rhythm guitar
 Tommy Eyre – synthesizer, electric and acoustic piano 
 Gary Taylor – bass
 Henry Spinetti – drums
 Glen Le Fleur – congas
 Graham Preskett – string arrangements

Chart performance
"Baker Street" reached No. 3 in the UK and No. 2 for six consecutive weeks in the US, kept out of the number-one spot by Andy Gibb's "Shadow Dancing".

A music industry rumor claims that "Baker Street" did manage to overtake "Shadow Dancing" in one of the latter's seven weeks at the summit, with Casey Kasem recording his American Top 40 countdown placing it at the top. However, at a dinner with Gibb's managers, then-Billboard chart director Bill Wardlow was told if "Shadow Dancing" did not remain at #1, Gibb would be pulled from the lineup of an upcoming Billboard concert. Wardlow then called the magazine to leave the song at the top, and Kasem was told to re-record his countdown. Although this story is disputed, "Baker Street" did manage to spend two weeks at #1 on rival magazine Cashbox'''s singles chart, who had no such obligations to Gibb or his managers, causing some to think there may be truth to the account.

Weekly charts

Year-end charts

Certifications

Appearances in other media

 In 1987 the song was cited by guitarist Slash as an influence on his guitar solo in "Sweet Child o' Mine".
 The song is also heard in the closing scene of "Lisa's Sax," the episode of The Simpsons which recounts how Lisa Simpson received her first saxophone. Lisa performs a brief, cruder rendition of the hook before the music segues into Rafferty's recording. 
 Canadian rock musician AC Newman cited the song as an inspiration for his 2012 album, Shut Down the Streets.
 The song is featured in the video game Grand Theft Auto V, as part of the Los Santos Rock Radio track list.
 The song is featured in the Happy Endings episode "Cocktails and Dreams," as it soundtracks a series of erotic dreams the other main characters have about Dave after drinking cocktails at Dave's speakeasy truck. (Notably, Penny's dream involves a fingerpicked-guitar version rather than the famous saxophone version of the riff.)

Undercover version

British dance group Undercover covered the song on their 1992 album Check Out the Groove. This version reached No. 2 on the UK Singles Chart and became a top-three hit in Austria, Belgium, Germany, Ireland, the Netherlands, and Switzerland.

 Critical reception 
A writer for Lennox Herald picked the song as a "stand out" from the album. Pan-European magazine Music & Media wrote that "Gerry Rafferty's rainy days anthem is now transferred from the comfortable living room to the heat of clubland. The typical saxophone hook is on acid as well." Mark Frith from Smash Hits commented, "This one's quite good actually. Transformed from a hoary old late '70s epic into a PWL rave anthem for the '90s, Baker Street has tootling sax, great vocals and is probably the most unusual record turned into a rave tune ever."

Music video
A music video was made to accompany the song, shot in black-and-white.

Track listing
 "Baker Street" (edit) – 4:04
 "Baker Street" (extended mix) – 5:10
 "Sha-Bang" (extended mix) – 5:49

Charts

Weekly charts

Year-end charts

Certifications

Foo Fighters version

The US rock band Foo Fighters covered the song on their 1998 "My Hero" UK CD single release, on the Australian tour pack (Grey cover) release, on the limited-edition European bonus EP and as one of several bonus tracks added to the remastered tenth anniversary release of their second studio album, The Colour and the Shape'', reissued in 2007. The cover does not include the saxophone riff the original is known for, instead being played with electric guitars.

References

External links
 
 "Baker Street (Remix)" at Discogs

1978 songs
1978 singles
1992 debut singles
1998 singles
Black-and-white music videos
Gerry Rafferty songs
Number-one singles in Australia
Number-one singles in South Africa
Cashbox number-one singles
RPM Top Singles number-one singles
Songs about London
Songs about streets
Songs written by Gerry Rafferty
Undercover (dance group) songs
United Artists Records singles
Pete Waterman Entertainment singles
Capitol Records singles